"Stop Stop Stop" is a song by British pop group the Hollies that was written by group members Allan Clarke, Tony Hicks, and Graham Nash. The song was the band's first to credit Clarke, Nash and Hicks as songwriters, as all their previous original songs had been published under the collective pseudonym "L. Ransford" (or simply "Ransford"). It later appeared on the album For Certain Because in the United Kingdom.

The song was released as a single by the Parlophone label in October 1966 and was released around the same time in the United States by Imperial Records. It was the last single that The Hollies released that year (see 1966 in music) and became a worldwide hit reaching the top 10 of the singles charts in 8 countries, including at #1 in Canada. There is also an Italian version, made by Rita Pavone. The song was covered by Minneapolis Celtic-punk group Boiled in Lead on their 1989 album From the Ladle to the Grave, also interpolating a traditional Egyptian melody into the song.

Background and recording 
"Stop Stop Stop" is notable for being one of the few recordings by the group that feature Tony Hicks playing the banjo, and was the only song with that instrument to be performed live by the group. The banjo was played through tape delay so that it sounds like a balalaika, while the tempo was similarly influenced by Middle Eastern and Greek music, which, combined with Bobby Elliott's vehement cymbal crashes, results in what critic Richie Unterberger describes as one of the most offbeat rock songs of 1966. The song – like most others by the group – feature a three-part vocal harmony between Clarke, Hicks, and Nash. The song was recorded at Abbey Road Studios in London, England and was produced by Ron Richards.

Graham Nash has said in various interviews that this song was inspired by the time American record executive and impresario Morris Levy took him and the rest of the band to a strip club. They had not been to one before since they did not have any in their hometown of Manchester.

"Stop Stop Stop" is similar to the song "Come On Back", also written by Clarke-Hicks-Nash, which was released as the B-side of "We're Through" in September 1964.

Reception 
The reception for the song in North America was so strong that the group's record labels in the United States (Imperial) and Canada (Capitol) released a studio album by the group titled Stop! Stop! Stop!, which was originally released in the United Kingdom as For Certain Because.

Cash Box said that it is a "wild tongue-in-cheeker [that] is the tale of a belly dancer couched in a middle eastern mode, with loads of appeal."

Charts

References

External links 

 Official animated music video

The Hollies songs
Parlophone singles
1966 singles
RPM Top Singles number-one singles
Songs written by Graham Nash
1966 songs
Songs written by Allan Clarke (singer)
Songs written by Tony Hicks